The Morton Memorial Laboratory of Chemistry is located on the campus of the Stevens Institute of Technology at Sixth and River Streets in the City of Hoboken in Hudson County, New Jersey. It was named after Henry Morton (1836–1902), the first president of the university. Built from 1905 to 1906, the building was added to the National Register of Historic Places on April 25, 2022, for its significance in architecture.

See also
National Register of Historic Places listings in Hudson County, New Jersey

References

External links
 

Buildings and structures in Hoboken, New Jersey
Stevens Institute of Technology
Neoclassical architecture in New Jersey
National Register of Historic Places in Hudson County, New Jersey
University and college buildings on the National Register of Historic Places in New Jersey
University and college buildings completed in 1906
1906 establishments in New Jersey
Brick buildings and structures
New Jersey Register of Historic Places